Rustai-ye Abolfazl ebn Magh (also Romanized as Rūstāī-ye Abolfaz̤l ebn Magh; also known as Abolfaz̤l) is a village in Bajgan Rural District, Aseminun District, Manujan County, Kerman Province, Iran. At the 2006 census, its population was 491, in 120 families.

References 

Populated places in Manujan County